Opfikon is a railway station in Switzerland, in the municipality of Opfikon. The station is served by Zürich S-Bahn line S7. Opfikon station is some  walk from Glattbrugg station on S-Bahn line S5 and the Stadtbahn Glattal.

The Opfikon station has a single central platform, which is flanked by two tracks. The two through tracks of the Zürich Airport station branch of the Zürich to Winterthur line run parallel to the platform, but are not connected to the platform tracks in the vicinity of the station.

The station is situated on the Wettingen–Effretikon line, originally opened by the Swiss National Railway (Schweizerische Nationalbahn; SNB)  in 1877 and bypassing Zürich. However the passenger trains that stop at the station all operate from Zürich, using a connection from Zürich Oerlikon station opened in 1881. The station area was heavily modified in 1978, when the airport branch and its through tracks were added.

Services 
The following services stop at Opfikon:

References

External links 
 
 

Railway stations in the canton of Zürich
Swiss Federal Railways stations
Opfikon